Annonoideae is a subfamily of plants in the family Annonaceae, with genera distributed in tropical areas world-wide.  The family and this subfamily are based on the type genus Annona.

Tribes and genera
The following genera, subdivided into seven tribes are accepted:

Annoneae
Auth.: Endlicher 1839
 Annona L. (synonym Rollinia A. St.-Hil.)
 Anonidium Engl. & Diels
 Asimina Adans. (synonym Deeringothamnus Small)
 Boutiquea Le Thomas
 Diclinanona Diels
 Disepalum Hook. f.
 Goniothalamus (Blume) Hook.f. & Thomson (synonym Richella A.Gray)
 Neostenanthera Exell

Bocageeae

Auth.: Endlicher 1839
 Bocagea A.St.-Hil.
 Cardiopetalum Schltdl.
 Cymbopetalum Benth.
 Froesiodendron R.E.Fr.
 Hornschuchia Nees
 Mkilua Verdc.
 Porcelia Ruiz & Pav.
 Trigynaea Schltdl.

Duguetieae

Auth.: Chatrou & Saunders 2012
 Duckeanthus R.E.Fr.
 Duguetia A.St.-Hil.
 Fusaea (Baill.) Saff.
 Letestudoxa Pellegr.
 Pseudartabotrys Pellegr.

Guatterieae
Auth.: Hooker & Thomson 1855
 Guatteria Ruiz & Pav.

Monodoreae
[[File:Monodora myristica (Annonaceae) in the Dja Faunal Reserve.jpg|thumb|Monodora myristica']]
Auth.: Baill. 1868
 Asteranthe Engl. & Diels
 Hexalobus A.DC.
 Isolona Engl.
 Mischogyne Exell
 Monocyclanthus Keay
 Monodora Dunal
 Ophrypetalum Diels
 Sanrafaelia Verdc.
 Uvariastrum Engl.
 Uvariodendron (Engl. & Diels) R.E.Fr.
 Uvariopsis Engl.

Uvarieae

Auth.: Hooker & Thomson 1855
 Afroguatteria Boutique
 Balonga Le Thomas
 Cleistochlamys Oliv.
 Dasymaschalon (Hook.f. & Thomson) Dalla Torre & Harms
 Desmos Lour.
 Dielsiothamnus R.E.Fr.
 Fissistigma Griff.
 Friesodielsia Steenis
 Melodorum Lour.
 Mitrella Miq.
 Monanthotaxis Baill.
 Pyramidanthe Miq.
 Sphaerocoryne (Boerl.) Ridl.
 Toussaintia Boutique
 Uvaria L.

Formerly, Schefferomitra Diels now a synoyn of FriesodielsiaXylopieae
Auth.: Endlicher 1839
 Artabotrys R.Br.
 Xylopia'' L.

References

External links 
 

Annonaceae
Plant subfamilies